Steinþór Jakobsson (7 November 1931 – 19 March 1996) was an Icelandic alpine skier. He competed in the men's giant slalom at the 1956 Winter Olympics.

References

1931 births
1996 deaths
Steinthor Jakobsson
Steinthor Jakobsson
Alpine skiers at the 1956 Winter Olympics
Steinthor Jakobsson
20th-century Icelandic people